The 2006–07 All-Ireland Junior B Club Hurling Championship was the second staging of the All-Ireland Junior B Club Hurling Championship since its establishment by the Killeedy GAA Club in 2005. The championship ran from 14 January to 25 March 2007.

The All-Ireland final was played on 25 March 2007 at Páirc Íde Naofa between Menlo Emmetts and Tara Rocks, in what was their first ever meeting in the final. Menlo Emmetts  won the match by 0–16 to 1–12 to claim their first ever All-Ireland title.

Leinster Junior B Club Hurling Championship

Leinster final

Munster Junior B Club Hurling Championship

Munster quarter-final

Munster semi-finals

Munster final

All-Ireland Junior B Club Hurling Championship

All-Ireland semi-finals

All-Ireland final

References

All-Ireland Junior B Club Hurling Championship
All-Ireland Junior B Club Hurling Championship
All-Ireland Junior Club Hurling Championship